Ayin Hillel was the pen name of Hillel Omer (4 August 1926 - 30 June 1990), an Israeli poet and children's author.

Biography
Hillel Kotovitz (later Omer) was born in  Kibbutz Mishmar HaEmek in the Jezreel Valley to Binyamin and Shlomit Kotovitz. He fought in the Palmach during the 1948 Arab-Israeli War. From 1954 to 1969 he was a landscape designer in Jerusalem. He designed the city's botanical and biblical gardens and continued to work in landscaping after moving to Tel Aviv. He was married to Zipporah, with whom he had two daughters, Tal and Nuli.

Literary career
Omer's work has been translated into English, French, German, Greek, Hungarian, Spanish, and Russian. Among his most famous compositions are "Why Does the Zebra Wear Pajamas" (1959) and "Uncle Simcha" (1964).

Ayin Hillel's poem, Hanesher (The Vulture), is written in Biblical Hebrew, but expresses the doubts and disillusions of the twentieth century.

Awards and recognition
In 1976, Ayin Hillel won the Fichman Prize. In 1990, he won  the Hans Christian Andersen Award for his contribution to children's literature.

Published works

Poetry
 The Noon Country, Sifriat Poalim, 1950 [Eretz Ha-Tzohorayim]  
 Nisra, The Author, 1962 [Nisra]  
 Hunting Madness, Am Oved, 1964 [Teruf Toref]  
 Eulogy, Hakibbutz Hameuchad, 1973 [Hodayah]  
 Speak, Hakibbutz Hameuchad, 1980 [Dabri]  
 Joseph and Potiphar's Wife, Hakibbutz Hameuchad, 1982 [Yossef Ve-Eshet Potifar]  
 Until Now, Hakibbutz Hameuchad, 1983 [Ad Co]  
 Holon's Fables, Sifriat Poalim, 1991 [Mishlei Holon]

Children's books

 Why Does the Zebra Wear Pajamas?, Sifriat Poalim, 1959 [Lama Loveshet Ha-Zebra Pijama]  
 Abroad, Abroad!, Sifriat Poalim, 1960 [Hutz La-Aretz, Hutz La-Aretz]  
 Nobody Can See Me, Massada, 1967 [Oti Lir'ot Af Ehad Lo Iachol]  
 Uncle Simcha, Hakibbutz Hameuchad, 1969/99 [Dodi Simha]  
 I'm a Warbler, Hakibbutz Hameuchad, 1970 [Ani Pashosh]  
 Good Morning, Hakibbutz Hameuchad, 1971 [Boker Tov]  
 Bulbul, Why?, Massada, 1972 [Bulbul, Lama Kacha?]  
 Birdie, Birdie, Hakibbutz Hameuchad, 1973 [Rom Tziporim Tziporim Tzip]  
 Giraffe in Blue Jeans, Hakibbutz Hameuchad, 1976 [Giraf Be-Jeans Kahol]  
 Uncle Simcha's Voice, Hakibbutz Hameuchad, 1976 [Kol Dodi Simha]  
 How Are You Mrs. Ladybird, Am Oved, 1977 [Shalom Lach Para Moshe Rabenu]  
 From Fly To Elephant, Keter, 1977 [Mi-Zvuv Ve-Ad Pil]  
 A Story About Cats, Keter, 1977 [Ma'ase Be-Hatulim]  
 Yossi, Smart Child of Mine, Massada, 1978 [Yossi Yeled Sheli Mutzlah]  
 Unbelievable, Ministry of Education, 1978 [Lo Yeuman]  
 When Uncle Simcha Sings, Zionist Confederation, 1984 [Ke-She Dod Simha Shar]  
 I'm a Warbler, Certainly and Maybe, Hakibbutz Hameuchad, 1987 [Ani Pashosh Betah Ve-Ulai]  
 The Book of Scribble-songs, R. Sirkis, 1988 [Sefer Ha-Kishkushirim]  
 A Cloud in My Hand, Sifriat Poalim, 1989 [Anan Ba-Yad]  
 It Happened to a Fawn, Kinneret, 1989 [Ma'ase Be-Ofer Ayalim]  
 Ayin Hillel's Big Book, Am Oved, 1992 [Ha-Sefer Ha-Gadol Shel Ayin Hillel]
 A Kibbutz Adventure, London, F. Warne, 1963

Other
Blue and Thorns (Tkehlet vekotzim), Sifriyat Hapoalim, 1977

See also
Hebrew literature

References

1926 births
1990 deaths
Israeli poets
20th-century poets